Riddarfjärden ("The Knight Firth") is the easternmost bay of Lake Mälaren in central Stockholm.  Stockholm was founded in 1252 on an island in the stream where Lake Mälaren (from the west) drains into the Baltic Sea (to the east); today the island is called Stadsholmen and constitutes Stockholm's Old Town.

The panorama picture featured in this article was taken from the heights of Södermalm, west of Stadsholmen, looking down on Riddarfjärden. Left to right are viewable:
 Västerbron bridge
 Kungsholmen Island
 Stockholm City Hall, a red brick building with a bell tower, where the Nobel Prize dinner is served
 The tower of Klara Kyrka on Norrmalm, with its green copper roof
 five white sky scrapers between Sergels torg and Hötorget
 construction cranes
 iron tower of Riddarholmen Church on Riddarholmen Island
 yellow tower of Storkyrkan on Stadsholmen, in front of the flat roof of the Stockholm Palace
 narrow tower of Tyska Kyrkan on Stadsholmen
 distant radio and TV tower Kaknästornet

Seasons
Riddarfjärden throughout the year.

See also 
 Geography of Stockholm

External links 

Bays of Sweden
Mälaren
Geography of Stockholm
Landforms of Stockholm County